Orléans Attackers is a Saint Martin football club based in Quartier-d'Orleans. Club colors are  black and orange.

In the 2012–13 season, the club won the Saint-Martin Championships, the top tier of football in the Collectivity of Saint Martin

Honours
Saint-Martin Championships: 8
 2001–02, 2004–05, 2005–06, 2006–07, 2007–08, 2009–10, 2012–13,2014/15

References

External links
Club profile - Weltfussballarchiv.com
Club profile - Footballzz.co.uk

Football clubs in Saint Martin